The Eutelsat TV Awards, also known as The ETVA, is a television prize, awarded by Eutelsat and dedicated to thematic television broadcast across Europe, Africa and the Middle East via the satellites of Eutelsat. Prizes are assigned in 10 categories: Children's, Cinema, Culture/ Education, Documentaries, Fiction/ General Entertainment, Lifestyle, Music, National Window, News and Sports. The ceremony is held in November in Venice, Italy.

History
Originally known as "The HOT BIRD TV Awards", they were launched to recognise the wealth of new content generated by thematic channels at the satellites of Eutelsat and were held for the first time in 1998 in Vicenza, Italy, during the SAT Expo show. The name of the award came from the namesake satellites (“HOT BIRD”).
The event has always been celebrated in Italy (from Vicenza to Turin to Venice, its present location) and through the years it has become a more international moment, gathering the world of international broadcasting.
Originally the HOT BIRD TV Awards were assigned in just 7 categories: when the thematic landscape expanded, the number of categories followed suit, reaching the present number of 10. Until 2010 categories also included HDTV, then excluded because no longer an exceptional standard.
In 2012 Awards have been rebranded as "The Eutelsat TV Awards". The new name expresses the inclusive character of the competition, since it is open to channels broadcasting from all Eutelsat satellites.

The Awards
The ten prizes are assigned by a jury of international independent media experts: a popular award (People's Choice Award) is also assigned to the channel that receives the highest number of votes online. In 2012, for the third year, prizes were also assigned to the Best Programme and to the Best New Channel, out of all the registered channels launched at Eutelsat over the past 12 months. 
The Eutelsat TV Award is a bronze statue, named Gaia, which in Greek mythology is the goddess of the earth and her myth is a metaphor for satellites that silently encircle the world. Runners-up receive a plate displaying the figure of Gaia, commemorating their participation in the event.

The shortlist of channels is presented during a gala ceremony which is generally held in November in Venice.

Past Winners

References

External links
The Eutelsat TV Awards official website

Italian television awards
Awards established in 1998